Sergeant Arthur Frederick Saunders VC (22 April 1878 – 30 July 1947) was an English recipient of the Victoria Cross, the highest and most prestigious award for gallantry in the face of the enemy that can be awarded to British and Commonwealth forces.

Early life

He was born on 22 April 1878 in Ipswich one of 12 children of Thomas Saunders, a saddle and harness maker, and his wife Anne Victoria Clarke. The family then lived at 180 Cauldwell Hall Road in the parish of St John's Church in Ipswich. He was baptised on 24 April. The family moved every few years and were certainly tenants, struggling to make ends meet. He attended St John's Church of England Primary School in the town then California School in Ipswich.

Navy
In November 1893 Arthur joined The Marine Society Training Ship Warspite, which was moored at Woolwich, and began trining for the Merchant Navy. On 25 February 1895 he joined the Royal Navy as a Boy, 2nd Class, at just under age 17.

On 22 April 1896 (his 18th birthday), he signed-up for a continuous service engagement with the Royal Navy of 12 years, which he completed in 1908. He mainly served on HMS Pembroke then at the torpedo training school at HMS Vernon. During his time in the Royal Navy he served as a petty officer (2nd Class). After leaving the Royal Navy he worked for the agricultural equipment company Ransomes, Sims & Jeffries.

Army

Arthur joined the Territorial Army and was attached as a reserve unit attached to the Suffolk Regiment. As such, at the outbreak of war, he (and all "reservists") were required to go into full service at the onset of war. Therefore, on 19 September 1914 he officially transferred to full service in the British Army. He served in France with the 9th Battalion of the Suffolk Regiment, as a part of the British Expeditionary Force (BEF) from 30 August 1915.

His award came as a result of the Battle of Loos on the Western Front in September 1915. His battalion were supporting the advance of the Cameron Highlanders. He was 37 years old, and a sergeant in the 9th (Service) Battalion, Suffolk Regiment, British Army during the First World War  when the following deed took place for which he was awarded the VC.

On 26 September 1915 near Loos, France,

A statement from Lt Crispinson, an officer he assisted said: a shell landed and blew part of his (Arthur's) left leg off, above the knee". A tourniquet was applied and he continued to fight, using a Lewis gun to hold back advancing German troops, some 150 in number. The Germans were somewhat surprised when this heavily injured man began to fire on them. The officer also then joined in the attack. The  Germans retreated.

They were recovered by stretcher bearers from the Royal Engineers, but further shelling left them abandoned before eventually being brought to an Advanced Dressing Station by stretcher bearers from the Scots Guards. The Victoria Cross was announced on 30 March 1916, whilst still convalescing in hospital. It was the first VC to be awarded to the Suffolk Regiment so they were very proud of him. Lt Crispinson was awarded the Military Cross for his own part.

Common belief states that the wounds to his leg meant that it was amputated when he reached an Advanced Dressing Station.  However, this is inaccurate.  After medical attention and a period of convalescence his leg had become 3 inches shorter therefore he wore a medical boot to aid his walking. On account of his wounds he was returned to England, and received a hero's welcome in his town home of Ipswich on 22 June 1916. He met the town's mayor at the town hall with senior officers from his regiment. A collection held in his honour enabled him to purchase a house on Foxhall Road in the California district of east Ipswich.

He was presented with his Victoria Cross on 27 June 1916 by King George V at Buckingham Palace.

He was discharged from the army at the depot of the Suffolk Regiment on 13 November 1916. He was awarded the Silver War Badge on 5 December 1916. After the war he received the 1914-15 Star, British War Medal, and the Victory Medal, as complements to his Victoria Cross.

In 1920 he was given Freedom of the Burgh of Ipswich, and in 1923 was made a Justice of the Peace.

In 1939, Saunders worked as a drawing office clerk in Ransomes, Sims & Jeffries lawn mower department. During the Second World War he served in the 11th Suffolk Home Guard.

Early in 1947 he was invited to a dinner in his honour in Glasgow by the Cameron Highlanders whose retreat he had protected back in 1915 at Loos. He was granted honorary membership of the regiment.

He died on 30 July 1947 of kidney problems, he was cremated and his ashres scattered in Ipswich Cemetery's Garden of Rest.

Legacy
His VC was given to the Suffolk Regiment Museum in Bury St Edmunds by his widow in 1989.

A blue plaque was erected to Arthur at his 1914 home of 180 Cauldwell Hall Road in Ipswich in September 2010. A memorial also exists in the paving at Christchurch Park in Ipswich.

Family

On 6 December 1908 he married 18 year old Edith Muriel Everitt. Their son Thomas was born in 1909 Edward was born in 1912. His daughter Nina was born in 1923.

References

Bibliography
Monuments to Courage (David Harvey, 1999)
The Register of the Victoria Cross (This England, 1997)
VCs of the First World War (Peter F. Batchelor & Christopher Matson, 1999)

External links
Location of grave and VC medal (Suffolk)
Website dedicated to Sgt. Saunders and the Victoria Cross medal

1879 births
1947 deaths
Military personnel from Ipswich
Royal Navy sailors
Suffolk Regiment soldiers
British Home Guard soldiers
British World War I recipients of the Victoria Cross
British Army personnel of World War I
British Army recipients of the Victoria Cross